Roberto Costa Cabral or Roberto Costa, as he was known, (born December 8, 1954 in Santos) is a former football player from Brazil. He played goalkeeper (height : 1,85m), mainly with Atlético Paranaense. He twice received the Bola de Ouro award (Golden Ball in English) given to the best player in the Campeonato Brasileiro (Brazilian championship).

He has one cap with the Brazil national team.

Clubs
 Flamengo of Varginha
Santos FC
1978–1983: Atlético Paranaense
 1984–1984: Coritiba Foot Ball Club
 1984–1984: Club de Regatas Vasco da Gama
Internacional
 Taguatinga
Caldense.
 1987–1987: Atlético Paranaense

He adopted the surname “Costa” to differentiate himself from “Roberto Dinamite” who played at that time. After two Paraná State championship, gained with Atlético Paranaense, he joined Vasco and was vice-champion of the Campeonato Brasileiro Série A in 1984.

Honours
Winner of Paraná State championship in 1982 and 1983 with Atlético Paranaense
Bola de Ouro in 1983 and 1984

External links

history Roberto Costa.

1954 births
Living people
Sportspeople from Santos, São Paulo
Brazilian footballers
Association football goalkeepers
Brazil international footballers
Campeonato Brasileiro Série A players
Club Athletico Paranaense players
Sport Club Internacional players
Santos FC players
Coritiba Foot Ball Club players
CR Vasco da Gama players